Wainuiomata is a large suburb of Lower Hutt, in the Wellington Region of New Zealand's North Island.

Origin of name
The word 'Wainui-o-mata' is a Māori name made up of the words Wai = water, Nui = big, O = of, and Mata – which could refer to a woman's name. The origins of the word are disputed, but one commonly accepted translation refers to the women who came over the Wainuiomata Hill to evade marauding tribes from the north, and who sat wailing by the stream after the slaughter of their menfolk. From this we have 'faces streaming with water' or 'tears' although it could equally refer to the large pools of water which lay over the swampy surface (face) of the northern end of the Valley, or the river itself which is known to flood the Wainui (Coast Road) valley.

The town is often abbreviated to Wainui by locals.

History
Wainuiomata occupies a basin at the headwaters of the Wainuiomata River, between the eastern Hutt hills and the Orongorongo Range. There are conflicting reports about the evidence of Māori occupation of the basin prior to European settlement. One source says there is evidence Māori were in Wainuiomata from the moa-hunting period and the iwi Rangitane, Ngāti Ira and Kahungunu were all settled there.  The earliest European settlements grew up around the river, where timber mills supplied the Wellington region when the demand was great in the 1850s and '60s. Today this area is known as "The Village" or "Homedale". The isolated location of  Wainuiomata proved a problem for early settlers. Narrow hill-routes into the settlement were the only access during the 1850s and 1860s.   By the end of the 19th century there were two roads in the valley: Main Road and Fitzherbert Road (known locally as "Swamp Road").

The town's economy in these early days largely depended on timber milling from the forests around the Wainuiomata River. In the 1850s Sir William Fitzherbert started a flax-milling business in the north of the valley, but this proved economically unviable.

In 1866 the Methodist Wainuiomata Coast Road Church was built on land donated by settler Richard Prouse. The oldest Methodist Church and the third-oldest church in the Wellington Region, it was used for regular services until the congregation outgrew it and moved to the new St Stephens Church in 1957.

With the clearing of the forests, sheep- and dairy-farming became an important part of the local economy. The settlement started to grow in the 1920s.

In 1928 Wainui-o-Mata Development Limited formed for the purpose of developing the Wainuiomata Valley through the acquisition of 1,600 hectares (4,000 acres) of land, its subdivision and its sale as residential lots. An important part of the project involved the construction of the Wainuiomata Tunnel linking the Hutt Valley and Wainuiomata Valley for improving access to the new settlement. Construction of the tunnel commenced in 1932, but the Depression bought a halt to construction, with many investors in the company losing money.

After World War II ended in 1945, major growth occurred due to affordable housing developments attracting many young couples, which transformed Wainuiomata into a working-class community. This influx of young families earned the community the nickname of "Nappy Valley" in the 1950s.

New Zealand's first Kōhanga Reo opened in Wainuiomata in 1982.

Gary McCormick's 1994 documentary series Heartland featured an episode about Wainuiomata. The programme angered many local people because it focussed on negative aspects and ignored many positive things going on in the valley. One resident featured on the programme was Chloe Reeves, who for a time became known as 'Chloe of Wainuiomata'.

In April 2009 a Palmerston North motelier banned all Wainuiomata residents after a series of misdemeanours by visitors from there.

The first series of the television production Seven Periods with Mr Gormsby was shot in the old Wainuiomata College with many local residents as cast members.

In 2022, a study commissioned by Wellington Regional Council and conducted by Jim Lynch, the founder of Zealandia, found that establishing a wildlife sanctuary in the Wainuiomata Water Collection Area was "technically and practically feasible". The name given to the proposed sanctuary is Puketahā.

Geography

Hills surround Wainuiomata on three sides. The topography reduces local wind-flow, resulting in lower minimum temperatures in winter and higher maximum temperatures in summer than in most other parts of Wellington and the Hutt Valley.

The Orongorongo Valley, accessed via the Wainuiomata Valley, features bush walks and native-forest scenery.

Demographics

Wainuiomata Central

Wainuiomata Central had a population of 1,803 at the 2018 New Zealand census, an increase of 123 people (7.3%) since the 2013 census, and an increase of 168 people (10.3%) since the 2006 census. There were 609 households. There were 858 males and 942 females, giving a sex ratio of 0.91 males per female. The median age was 36.7 years (compared with 37.4 years nationally), with 390 people (21.6%) aged under 15 years, 351 (19.5%) aged 15 to 29, 801 (44.4%) aged 30 to 64, and 264 (14.6%) aged 65 or older.

Ethnicities were 67.2% European/Pākehā, 28.0% Māori, 14.6% Pacific peoples, 10.3% Asian, and 1.8% other ethnicities (totals add to more than 100% since people could identify with multiple ethnicities).

The proportion of people born overseas was 19.3%, compared with 27.1% nationally.

Although some people objected to giving their religion, 43.4% had no religion, 40.4% were Christian, 3.3% were Hindu, 0.3% were Muslim, 1.0% were Buddhist and 3.7% had other religions.

Of those at least 15 years old, 165 (11.7%) people had a bachelor or higher degree, and 363 (25.7%) people had no formal qualifications. The median income was $29,400, compared with $31,800 nationally. The employment status of those at least 15 was that 717 (50.7%) people were employed full-time, 168 (11.9%) were part-time, and 87 (6.2%) were unemployed.

Greater Wainuiomata

Wainuiomata had a population of 17,910 at the 2018 New Zealand census, an increase of 1,203 people (7.2%) since the 2013 census, and an increase of 1,266 people (7.6%) since the 2006 census. There were 5,880 households. There were 8,811 males and 9,093 females, giving a sex ratio of 0.97 males per female, with 4,059 people (22.7%) aged under 15 years, 3,915 (21.9%) aged 15 to 29, 7,932 (44.3%) aged 30 to 64, and 2,001 (11.2%) aged 65 or older.

Ethnicities were 66.6% European/Pākehā, 30.4% Māori, 15.9% Pacific peoples, 8.5% Asian, and 2.2% other ethnicities (totals add to more than 100% since people could identify with multiple ethnicities).

The proportion of people born overseas was 17.8%, compared with 27.1% nationally.

Although some people objected to giving their religion, 48.5% had no religion, 37.1% were Christian, 2.3% were Hindu, 0.4% were Muslim, 0.7% were Buddhist and 3.5% had other religions.

Of those at least 15 years old, 1,611 (11.6%) people had a bachelor or higher degree, and 3,195 (23.1%) people had no formal qualifications. The employment status of those at least 15 was that 7,458 (53.8%) people were employed full-time, 1,695 (12.2%) were part-time, and 774 (5.6%) were unemployed.

Government
Since the 1989 New Zealand local government reforms, Wainuiomata (together with Petone, Eastbourne and Lower Hutt) has been governed by Hutt City Council. The Wainuiomata ward covers the suburb and the surrounding rural area, electing one councillor to the Hutt City Council. Since the 2019 local elections, the ward has been represented by Keri Brown.

At the national level, Wainuiomata falls in the Hutt South general electorate and the Ikaroa-Rāwhiti Māori electorate. Lower Hutt resident and Labour Party MP Ginny Andersen represents Hutt South.

Economy
Wainuiomata has traditionally been a dormitory suburb: most residents work outside the valley. Several factories that operated in Wainuiomata during the second half of the twentieth century have since closed down.

Wainuiomata Mall

Wainuiomata Mall was established in 1969. After struggling for several years the mall was demolished in 2020, to be made into a smaller shopping centre with a new Countdown supermarket.

Brugger Industries
Frank Brugger began business in Petone and his company Brugger Industries established a factory in Wainuiomata in 1970, employing hundreds of local people.  The company made car seats and other components for the domestic car assembly industry, and also manufactured a highly-efficient pyroclastic stove. Brugger retired in 1986 and the factory changed ownership, before closing in 1998.

Bata Shoe Company 
Bata had a shoe factory in Wainuiomata from about the 1960s, but it closed in 1992.

Tatra Leather Goods 
Tatra, founded by Frederick Turnovsky, produced leather accessories such as belts and wallets at a factory in Wainuiomata which operated between the 1960s and 1980s.

Feltex Carpets 
Feltex had a factory in Wainuiomata which was bought by Alliance Textiles in December 1996 and closed shortly after, with the loss of about 70 jobs. The building later housed a church, and in 2013 Big Save Furniture set up a distribution centre in the former factory.

Tom & Luke 
Tom & Luke is a snack food manufacturer based in Wainuiomata that sells its products in New Zealand and exports to Australia, Asia and the United States. It was founded by Tom Dorman and Luke Cooper in 2013. The company employs around 45 people, mostly locals. In 2022 Tom & Luke won the Wellington School of Business and Government Judge’s Choice Award at the ExportNZ ASB Wellington Export Awards.

Transport

The Wainuiomata Hill Road is the only road into and out of Wainuiomata, connecting the suburb with Gracefield and Waiwhetu. Four lanes wide (two in each direction), it is one of the steepest roads in the Wellington region; on the Lower Hutt side, the road climbs 195 metres in 1.9 km, resulting in an average grade of 10.3%.

Two regular bus routes serve Wainuiomata: 160 Wainuiomata North and 170 Wainuiomata South. Both bus routes travel to Lower Hutt Queensgate via Waterloo Interchange, where they connect with Hutt Valley Line train services to Wellington. Route 160 serves the northern neighbourhoods of Parkway, Arakura and Glendale, while route 170 serves the southern neighbourhoods of Fernlea and Homedale; both routes serve the shopping centre. Two peak-hour services, 80N and 80S, follow routes 160 and 170 within Wainuiomata respectively, but travel via Gracefield and Petone express to central Wellington.

A branch commuter railway line (see Wainuiomata railway proposals) was proposed at times in the 20th century, but never proceeded. In 2021  a Christchurch-based property development company advertised new townhouses in Wainuiomata as: "In close proximity to Wainuiomata Train Station with trains departing to Lower Hutt and Wellington regularly makes for an effortless daily commute".

Education
Wainuiomata has eight schools: six primary schools, an intermediate school and a secondary school.

Arakura School is a state contributing primary (Year 1–6) school in Arakura, and has  students as of 
Fernlea School is a state contributing primary (Year 1–6) school in Wainuiomata Central, and has  students as of 
Konini Primary School is a state contributing primary (Year 1–6) school in Parkway, and has  students as of  It was established in 2002 following the merger of Parkway School and Sun Valley School.
Pukeatua Primary School is a state full primary (Year 1–8) school in Glendale, and has  students as of  It was established in 2002 following the merger of Glendale School and Pencarrow School.
St Claudine Thevenet School is a state-integrated Catholic full primary (Year 1–8) school, and has  students as of  It was established in 2005 following the merger of St Matthew's School and St Patrick's School.
Wainuiomata High School is a state secondary (Year 9–13) school in Parkway, and has  students as of  It was established in 2002 following the merger of Parkway College and Wainuiomata College.
Wainuiomata Intermediate School is a state intermediate (Year 7–8) school in Parkway, and has  students as of  It was established in 2002 following the merger of Parkway Intermediate School and Wainuiomata Intermediate School.
Wainuiomata Primary School is a state contributing primary (Year 1–6) school in Homedale, and has  students as of  It was established in 1857 and merged with Wood Hatton School in 2002.

Kōhanga reo 

The first kōhanga reo or language nest opened in Wainuiomata in April 1982 at Pukeatua Kōhanga Reo. It was a pilot programme in response to less than 5% of Māori schoolchildren speaking te reo Māori (the Māori language) fluently. Kōhanga reo is immersion early childhood education taught by fluent speakers. By 1994 not only had kura kaupapa (primary and secondary school immersion) also been set up but there were there were 800 kōhanga reo.  Iritana Te Rangi Tāwhiwhirangi  and Wainuiomata resident Jean Puketapu started Pukeatua Kōhanga Reo together. The kōhanga reo model has been taken up by other communities around the world. On the 40th anniversary in 2022 Pukeatua Kōhanga Reo had moved to a bigger premises and was led by Kuini Garthwaite (Ngāti Porou).

Arts 
Wainuiomata hosts the annual Wellington Folk Festival over Labour Weekend in October. The community theatre society is called Wainuiomata Little Theatre and has been operating since 1956, Bruce Mason was the patron when it started.

Fire brigade

Wainuiomata has a volunteer fire brigade, established in 1944 following a major house-fire in 1943. The siren blasts twice in an emergency and can be heard clearly throughout the valley.  The first superintendent was Mr J.S. Dunn.  The first station was built in 1945 on land opposite Wainuiomata Primary School.  The Wainuiomata Development Company donated land and timber to the brigade, with other brigades and companies donating hose, standpipes and ladders.  The Stokes Valley brigade supplied a Gwynne Trailer pump.

In the early days any available vehicle would tow the pump and trailer to calls.  Often this was a 30-seater bus, as one of the foundation members, Mr Artie Kilmister, was the local bus driver.  In 1946 the brigade took delivery of its first "real" fire engine, a Ford V8 Marmon-Herrington 4-wheel-drive.
This truck,  an ex Air Force tender, remained in service until 1965.  It had no flashing lights, only a siren and on occasions this failed: it was not unusual for members to yell from the truck "get out of the way", or words to that effect.

The Wainuiomata Volunteer Fire Brigade joined the United Fire Brigades Association of New Zealand (UFBA) in 1944.

Notable people

 Margie Abbott, wife of former Australian prime minister Tony Abbott, grew up in Wainuiomata
 Leo Auva'a, Leinster rugby player
Frank Brugger, OBE, businessman
 Murray Chandler, Chess Grandmaster 
 Trevor Mallard, MP and Speaker of the House 
 Beth Mallard, Black Fern and daughter of Trevor  Mallard
Ihakara Puketapu, former Secretary for Maori Affairs
Jean Puketapu, founder of Kohanga Reo
 Neemia Tialata, All Black rugby player 
 Tana Umaga, All Black rugby player 
 Piri Weepu, All Black rugby player

References

Bibliography

External links
 Wainuiomata online

Suburbs of Lower Hutt
Populated places in the Wellington Region